Monte Maddalena is a mountain of Lombardy, Italy, It has an elevation of 874 metres.

Gallery

Mountains of the Alps
Mountains of Lombardy